Narbal Fontes (1902-1960) was a Brazilian writer. He wrote his books together with his wife, who is called Ofélia Fontes. He was born in Tietê, São Paulo, on August 21, 1902 and died in Rio de Janeiro city, state of Rio de Janeiro, on April 29, 1960.

Bibliography
 No Reino do Pau-Brasil
 Senhor Menino
 Regina, A Rosa de Maio
 Romance de São Paulo
 Rui, O Maior
 Precisa-se de Um Rei
 O Gigante de Botas
 Coração de Onça
 O Talismã de Vidro
 A Gigantinha
 A Espingarda de Ouro
 Aventuras de Um Coco da Bahia
 Esopo, O Contador de Estórias
 Novas Estórias de Esopo
 A Falsa Estória Maravilhosa
 Espírito do Sol
 O Micróbio Donaldo
 História do Bebê
 Ler, Escrever e Contar
 Ilha do Sol
 Brasileirinho
 Companheiros
 Pindorama
 O Menino dos Olhos Luminosos
 A Boa Semente
 A Vida de Santos Dumont
 O Bicho Sete Ciências
 O Gênio do Bem
 Cem Noites Tapuias

1902 births
1960 deaths
People from Tietê, São Paulo
Brazilian male writers